Tuure Elmeri Boelius (born 3 January 2001) is a Finnish YouTuber, singer and actor. He was born in Pori, Finland.

Career
Boelius signed a contract with Kaiku Entertainment in January 2017, with his first single, "Eikö sua hävetä", published in August 2017.

He has worked as an actor at several plays in Pori Theatre. He has also played Touko Laaksonen as a child  in Turku City Theatre.

Boelius competed on the eleventh season of Tanssii tähtien kanssa and placed third.

Personal life
Boelius came out as gay on a YouTube video in November 2016. He was chosen as Gay of the Year in February 2017 by QX Gay Gaala. Some people contacted the Finnish Ombudsman for Children because the award had been given to a minor. The Ombudsman commented that children's privacy should be protected but that children are also free to express themselves.

Discography

Singles

References

2001 births
Gay musicians
20th-century Finnish male singers
Finnish pop singers
Finnish stage actors
Finnish YouTubers
Living people
Finnish gay actors
Finnish gay musicians
Finnish LGBT singers
LGBT YouTubers
Gay singers
People from Pori
Singing talent show contestants
21st-century Finnish LGBT people